Christopher Charles Lyttelton, 12th Viscount Cobham, 12th Baron Cobham, 9th Baron Lyttelton, 9th Baron Westcote (born 23 October 1947) is a British nobleman and peer from the Lyttelton family in the United Kingdom.

Biography
The second son of the 10th Viscount Cobham, Lyttelton inherited the title on 13 July 2006 on the death of his elder brother, John Lyttelton, 11th Viscount Cobham, who had no children. He also inherited the family seat Hagley Hall, near Stourbridge in Worcestershire, which was in disrepair. His predecessor, the 11th Viscount, had managed to ease some of the debt by selling off land surrounding the house but the estate still faced mounting debts. He initiated restoration and conservation works around the dilapidated areas of the main house and the redevelopment of the park surrounding the house in cooperation with English Heritage and Natural England. Lord Cobham and his wife live in part of the main house while the rest is open to the public and available for hire as a weddings and events venue.

He was educated at Eton, where his father had been before him.

, Lord Cobham was working as a financial consultant at the accountancy firm Smith & Williamson in London. He enjoys flying gliders.

Marriage and issue
He married Teresa Mary (Tessa) Readman, daughter of Colonel Alexander George Jeremy Readman and Mary Kay Curtis, in 1973. They have two children: 
 Hon Oliver Christopher Lyttelton (born 1976), heir apparent
 Hon Sophie Emma Lyttelton (born 1978); married with children

The 6th Duke of Westminster was his first cousin.

References

1947 births
Living people
People educated at Eton College
12
Christopher